Gerardo Fernández Albor (7 September 1917 – 12 July 2018), also Xerardo Fernández Albor, was a Spanish physician and president of the autonomous community of Galicia from 1982. He lost a motion of no confidence in 1987. He was a member of the People's Alliance which became the People's Party.

Albor died in Santiago de Compostela on 12 July 2018, at the age of 100.

References

Presidents of the Regional Government of Galicia
1917 births
2018 deaths
Spanish centenarians
Recipients of the Order of Merit of the Federal Republic of Germany
University of Salamanca alumni
Members of the 1st Parliament of Galicia
Members of the 2nd Parliament of Galicia
Men centenarians